was the governor of Hiroshima Prefecture from 1880 to 1889. His most ambitious project was the construction of Ujina port (later to become Hiroshima Port), which was completed in November 1889. He was governor of Niigata Prefecture (1889–1891), Wakayama Prefecture (1891–1892), Aichi Prefecture (1892), Kyoto Prefecture (1892–1893) and Miyazaki Prefecture (1894–1898).

A bronze statue of Senda was constructed at Ujina, where it still stands today.

Notes

References
 Hiroshima Cultural Encyclopedia
 History of Hiroshima, at the site of Hiroshima municipality 

Governors of Hiroshima
1836 births
1908 deaths
Governors of Niigata Prefecture
Governors of Wakayama Prefecture
Governors of Aichi Prefecture
Governors of Kyoto
Governors of Miyazaki Prefecture